Jesper Samuelsson (born June 13, 1988) is a professional ice hockey player from Sweden. He has played for several teams, including  IF Sundsvall Hockey and Timrå IK.

In the 2008 NHL Entry Draft, Samuelsson was selected by the Detroit Red Wings in the 7th round, 211th overall. While he was not offered a contract with the Detroit Red Wings, he continued his career in Sweden.

Samuelsson has had success in his home country, including winning the Swedish HockeyAllsvenskan championship with Timrå IK in the 2017-2018 season. He has also represented Sweden in international competitions, playing for the national team in the 2012 World Junior Ice Hockey Championships.

External links

References 

1988 births
Swedish ice hockey centres
IF Sundsvall Hockey players
Timrå IK players
Living people
Detroit Red Wings draft picks
Sportspeople from Norrköping